Markus Rackl (born 3 March 1969) is a former professional tennis player from Germany.

Biography
A left-handed player from Traunstein, Rackl played professionally in the late 1980s and early 1990s. His best performance on tour came when he made the semi-finals of the Madrid Tennis Grand Prix in 1988, with wins over Marcelo Ingaramo, Edoardo Mazza and Sergio Casal. In 1988 he was also a quarter-finalist at the Athens Open after beating top seed Tore Meinecke and won a Challenger title in Montabaur. He won one further Challenger event, in Salzburg in 1991. As a coach he has worked with Alexander Satschko.

Challenger titles

Singles: (2)

References

External links
 
 

1969 births
Living people
German male tennis players
West German male tennis players
People from Traunstein
Sportspeople from Upper Bavaria
Tennis people from Bavaria